Tom Robb (July 12, 1948 – March 6, 2006) was an American session bassist who is best known for his work with acts like Dionne Warwick, Little Richard, Dolly Parton, The Marshall Tucker Band, and many others. He was also the featured bassist on Alicia Bridges' 1978 song, "I Love the Nightlife." Over the course of his career, he played bass on hundreds of records for a wide range of artists in Atlanta, Georgia and Nashville, Tennessee. He also helped create material for television shows, movies, and other publishing projects.

Early life
Robb was born and grew up in Passaic, New Jersey. As a child, Robb experienced homelessness and lived with several foster families. In high school, he spent time at the Bonnie Brae Farm for Boys near Basking Ridge, New Jersey. There, he began playing drums and taught himself how to play the bass. In the late 1960s, Robb moved to Greenwich Village in New York where he began playing in bands and doing session work in studios.

Career

In 1970, Robb moved to Atlanta, Georgia where he teamed up with Mylon LeFevre, a rock and gospel artist. LeFevre signed with Columbia Records, and formed the "Holy Smoke Doo Dah Band" with Auburn Burrell and J.P. Lauzon on guitar, drummer Marty Simon, Tom Robb on bass and keyboardist Lester Langdale. From 1970 through 1980, he performed alongside acts such as Eric Clapton, Elton John, Billy Joel, Duane Allman, Berry Oakley, Little Richard, and The Who among others. In 1973, Robb was recruited by Leslie West to join the Leslie West and the Wild West Show for a United States tour. He was filling in for regular bassist, Jack Bruce, who had fallen ill prior to the tour's start. From July to August 1973, the group toured the eastern and Midwestern United States alongside acts like Stevie Wonder, Humble Pie, Sly and the Family Stone, and Ted Nugent.

While in Atlanta, Robb did session work with artists like Little Richard, Dionne Warwick, Frankie Miller, Allen Toussaint, Browning Bryant, and Melissa Manchester. In 1978, he was the featured bassist on Alicia Bridges' Grammy-nominated "I Love the Nightlife," which peaked at number 2 on Billboard's disco chart and at number 5 on the pop chart. The song was produced by Steve Buckingham who remained Robb's friends for more than 30 years till his death. 

In 1980, Robb moved to Nashville, Tennessee where he worked in numerous studios. He did session work for a wide variety of artists, including Dolly Parton, Tammy Wynette, Sweethearts of the Rodeo, Eddie Rabbitt, The Winans, Aaron Tippin, Deborah Allen, Vern Gosdin, and many more. Robb was also a member of The Marshall Tucker Band from 1985 to 1987. Throughout his career, Robb played in hundreds of sessions and worked on television, film, and other publishing projects.

Personal life
Robb married singer-songwriter, Melanie Dyer, in 1987, and the couple remained together for 19 years until Robb's death in 2006. The two had no children together. Robb was an avid New York Yankees fan and he enjoyed acquiring sports collectibles. He was also known to be fond of many different animals, especially dogs.

Illness and death
In 2004, Robb was diagnosed with liver cancer. He died on March 6, 2006, from complications of the disease. On March 25, 2006, a memorial service for Robb was held in the Ford Theatre at the Country Music Hall of Fame and Museum in Nashville. In a June 2006 article in Bass Player Magazine, Robb's longtime friend and Nashville drummer Eddie Bayers noted, "I loved Tom Robb. He played right in the center of the beat. He wasn’t just in the pocket—he was the whole pair of pants!"

Selected discography
Robb was a regular member of Mylon LeFevre's Holy Smoke Doo Dah Band, The Marshall Tucker Band, Sweethearts of the Rodeo, Paul Davis' backing band, and Shirley Eikhard's backing band. He was also the bassist in all of the following recordings:

References

1948 births
2006 deaths
American session musicians
20th-century American bass guitarists